John Eaton may refer to:

John Eaton (divine) (born 1575), English divine
John Eaton (pirate) (fl. 1683–1686), English buccaneer
Sir John Craig Eaton (1876–1922), Canadian businessman
John Craig Eaton II (born 1937), Canadian businessman and grandson of Sir John Craig Eaton
John David Eaton (1909–1973), Canadian businessman
John Eaton (politician) (1790–1856), American politician and diplomat from Tennessee
John Eaton (composer) (1935–2015), American composer
John Eaton (pianist) (born 1934), American music teacher and pianist
John Eaton (educator) (1829–1906), U.S. Commissioner of education
Jack Eaton (1888–1968), American film producer and director
John Eaton (Royal Navy officer) (1902–1981), British admiral
John Eaton (cricketer) (1902–1972), English cricketer who played for Sussex
John P. Eaton (1926–2021), American author

See also
John Etton (died 1433), MP for Yorkshire
John Eatton Le Conte (1784–1860), American naturalist